Alexander Cross (16 June 1919 – 4 March 1998) was a Scottish amateur footballer who played in the Scottish League for Queen's Park as a left half. He was capped by Scotland at amateur level.

Personal life 
Cross attended Rutherglen Academy.

Career statistics

References 

Association football forwards
Scottish footballers
Queen's Park F.C. players
Scottish Football League players
Scotland amateur international footballers
1919 births
Sportspeople from Rutherglen
Association football wing halves
1998 deaths
Place of death missing
People educated at Rutherglen Academy
Footballers from South Lanarkshire